Education in Rwanda has undergone considerable changes throughout Rwanda's recent history, and has faced major disruptions due to periods of conflict. Education was divided by gender whereby women and men had a different education relevant to their responsibilities in day-to-day life. Women were mostly taught housekeeping while men were mainly taught how to hunt, rear animals, and fish. This is because Rwanda was a community based society where every member had a specific contribution to the overall development of the community. Older family members like grandparents usually took on the role of Educators.

Despite improvements to education and literacy as part of the country's rebuilding after the 1994 genocide, the education system still faces challenges including low school enrolment rates and limited resources. The education system is overseen by the Ministry of Education. 

The Human Rights Measurement Initiative (HRMI) finds that Rwanda is fulfilling only 73.1% of what it should be fulfilling for the right to education based on the country's level of income. HRMI breaks down the right to education by looking at the rights to both primary education and secondary education. While taking into consideration Rwanda's income level, the nation is achieving 94.7% of what should be possible based on its resources (income) for primary education but only 51.6% for secondary education.

History of Rwandan education

Prior to 1900

In Rwanda was informal and delivered largely through the family. Training was also delivered through Amatorero training schools. These courses included the military and war skills, iron smith and foundry, poetry, basket making.

1900 to 1960

Belgium created a plan to provide elementary school to as many children as possible from World War I to World War II, under a League of Nations mandate. The majority of schools were run by religious organisations and received government support if they followed the Belgian curriculum and other rules. A Belgian census of 1933 led to the measurement and the classification of the population along racial and ethnic lines.  Tutsis were given access to the best education at the prestigious Astrida Secondary School and groomed for colonial administrative jobs, ethnic tensions grew as a result. Hutus were often used as forced labor and many migrated to surrounding countries. The tensions grew up until 1959 when civil war broke out and many Tutsis were killed. Others went into exile.

1960 to 1994
After liberation, the focus was on the restructuring of the education system and development of a national curriculum. The main goal was to reach more Rwandan children and in particular to improve access to schooling in rural areas. A national curriculum and double shifting were introduced in 1966. From 1977 on, primary school 8 years of in Kinyarwanda, while 3 years of post-primary and secondary education were taught in French.

1994 to 2012
Post-genocide years focused on human capital rebuilding and increasing enrolment rates.
1996 saw the introduction of 6-year primary, 3-year lower secondary, and 3-year upper secondary education, where Kinyarwanda was the language of teaching up to 6-year primary, whereas lower and upper secondary, which changed to French and English.

In 2006, The 4th Education Sector Strategic Plan (ESSP 2006–2010) introduced fee-free schooling for 9YBE - 9 Year Basic Education - including primary and lower secondary. While enrolment rates have gone up, school related costs remain a barrier for many.

In 2008, in an effort to stimulate Rwanda's integration with the East African Community (EAC), English was adopted as the national teaching language, and only the first 3 years of primary are still taught in Kinyarwanda.

Several new authorities were created:
 The Workforce Development Authority (WDA) was created in 2008 to address the growing need for better, more, and more demand-driven policy for technical and vocational training.
 The Rwanda Education Board (REB), established in 2011, became the implementing agency for general education: giving education policy input on sciencies, coordinating implementation of education programs, overseeing curriculum development, education standards, national examinations for sciencies, etc.
 The Rwanda Polytechnic was created in mid February 2018 encompasses all integrated polytechnic regional center (IPRC), became the implementing agency for technical education standards, technical and vocational national examinations, etc.

2012 to 2016
Since 2012, under the new Education Sector Strategic Plan (ESSP 2013–2015), focus has shifted from increasing 9YBE access and enrollment to improving quality and relevance of schooling as well as increasing access to secondary level schooling with the introduction of the 12 Year Basic Education (12YBE) policy, making schooling fee-free up to upper secondary.

Ministry of Education

Education Minister
Dr. Valentine Uwamariya replaced Dr Eugene Mutimura in 2020 as minister of education

Mission Statement

"To combat ignorance and illiteracy"

"To provide human resources useful for the socio-economic development of Rwanda through education and training"

Education Finance

Education accounts for 15% of the national budget of which 9.5% is allotted to H.E.

In 2003 the state's total expenditure on education was 48 Billion Rwandan Francs (£48.6 million or $86m).

Between 1996 and 2001 total public spending rose from 3.2% to 5.5%. However much of this was channeled into Secondary and Tertiary education at the expense of Primary education.

Standards in education

The following bodies oversee educational standards

- Division of Construction and equipment
Sets standards for classroom/school construction.

- National Examination Council
Sets standards for grades and progression to the next stage of education.

- Department of planning
Sets and monitors standards on system performance indicators.

- General Inspectorate of education
Inspects and advises on standards adherence and compliance.

ICT in education

The Rwandan government has formed a national strategy for information and communications technology (ICT). This is co-ordinated by the Rwanda Information Technology Authority (RITA)  which was designed to serve as the national body to support the development and the implementation of the National Information and Communications Infrastructure in the public and private sectors.

The Ministry of Education (MINEDUC)  is active in promoting the use of ICT in schools and is co-ordinating the One Laptop Per Child project  in the country.

Although there is a shortage of ICT skills and technical support at the present time, ICT education is extending from tertiary institutions to all primary and secondary schools. This training is already paying dividends, with many students now being offered well paid (by local standards) part-time work. Rwanda could attract business through the bilingual French and English skills many locals have.

The Rwanda Education Commons (REC) is a four-year program funded by USAID to promote the effective use of ICTs in education. Since REC opened its office within MINEDUC in January 2009, it has worked to expand teachers' access to quality resources, to connect educators with each other, and to inspire and empower teachers. REC has a record of achieving its goals and a reputation as a practical and effective partner in assisting Rwanda to achieve its ICT in education goals. REC designed an education online platform www.educationcommons.rw This online community includes a digital library of high-quality resources aligned to the curriculum, discussion boards, social networking tools, and informational areas. More than 1,630 teachers have registered for the portal and they are regularly using it.

Some students have been studying through the African Virtual University which is allowing students to learn online while being taught by lecturers from other countries.

In October 2006, the NEPAD e-Africa Commission launched a project to further develop ICT in Rwandan schools. The project will link up schools across Africa, including primary and secondary levels, and is intended to grow; eventually it will incorporate all Rwandan secondary schools.

Two institutions are heavily involved in ICT education - KIST (Kigali Institute of Science and Technology)  and KIE (Kigali Institute of Education) .

Since 2005, KIE has been involved in an ICT in education initiative as part of the larger EdQual project , funded by the UK Department for International Development DfID and involving four African partner countries. The EdQual initiative in Rwanda  has been working with teachers in 12 primary and secondary schools in Rwanda. Through a programme of workshops and activities in schools, teachers have been developing their own ICT skills and using ICT to support teaching and learning of science and mathematics. Another small-scale EdQual project study has compared NEPAD e-Schools in Rwanda and Kenya.

Literacy Rate
The country's literacy rate, defined as those aged 15 or over who can read and write, was 71% in 2009, up from 38% in 1978 and 58% in 1991.

Education Issues in Rwanda
The level of education one has is often seen as a form of capital accumulation which helps in countries' development. In Rwanda, the government implemented policies over the years to ensure there is a high literacy rate among the population. As of 2004–2008, 77% of males and females are literate, which is a relatively high percentage, however, those who continue into secondary schooling stands at a low 31%. Nevertheless, the Ministry of Education (MINEDUC)  can be seen as partially successful in getting the young to receive schooling.

The education level, in Rwanda, remains low despite implementation of the policies such as mandatory education for primary school (6 years) and lower secondary schooling (3 years) that is run by state schools. The children are not required to pay school fees for the mandatory schooling. A Rwandan is expected to complete an average of 10.6 years of education. However, the mean number of years that a Rwandan spends on education is 3.3 years, which is lower than the expectation. It is also lower than the average years of schooling in developed countries and Sub-Saharan Africa, which are 10.0 years and 4.5 years respectively. Based on the 2010 Human Development Index (HDI) report, Rwanda is ranked at 152 out of a total of 169 countries under the 'Low Human Development' category.

The number of Rwandans admitted into schools has increased between 2001 and 2008, but the facilities and resources have not increased at the same rate. Enrollment in primary school almost doubled over the decade, with an average annual growth rate of 5.4 percent between 1998 and 2009, to reach almost 2.2 million students in 2008. However, enrollment growth slowed in 2007/08 with a total increase of only 40,000 students, compared
to an increase of 160,000 students in 2005/06. Surprisingly, no significant increase is apparent following the implementation of the fee-free primary education policy in 2003/04, implying that factors other than school fees play a role in the decision to send a child to school. In 2008, around 71 primary level pupils are taught in a single classroom and within the secondary school level for Rwandans, around 5 students shared 1 textbook on average. An average primary school teacher has to handle around 62 students as the class size increases at a faster rate as compared to the number of teachers employed. The schools in the more remote rural areas also find it tough to attract teachers.

The constraints are aggravated by the fact that supplementary reading materials were inadequate, particularly for the lower primary school grades.

(i) textbook distribution is heavily dependent on the availability of funds, which affects the government's ability to conduct adequate planning, and may not effectively respond to supply and demand
(ii) the evaluation of textbook publishing bids often take a long time
(iii) teachers feel that they are insufficiently involved in the textbook selection process
(iv) textbooks may be damaged because of poor distribution and stock management
These factors result in discrepancies in pupil to textbook ratios between schools and within districts. This goes to show that there is still a challenge in terms of access and high-quality textbooks in Rwanda which are expected to be addressed in upcoming plans.

About 40% of the teacher's population in Rwanda have less than 5 years of teaching experience. The number of teachers who are qualified in the primary school have increased to 99% in 2008, however, the number of teachers who are qualified in the secondary school are only 36% and 33% for lower and upper secondary respectively. This means that Rwanda is not able to produce a highly skilled workforce, especially when considering the large proportion of teachers who are not qualified to teach the secondary school pupils.

Most teachers felt that they have been poorly paid. As a result, only 10% of the total teacher respondents have undergone qualification upgrading to attain higher qualifications for teaching in Rwanda. Most of the secondary school teachers are studying for a higher qualification that is not for teaching. This shows that the incentive for further education is low and there are other jobs that have a higher benefit as compared to teaching in Rwanda. Overall, the lack of quality in the education system, such as the standards of the teachers, lack of facilities and resources makes schooling unattractive.

Primary schools

The language used for teaching in the first three years of primary education is Kinyarwanda. In the fourth through sixth years, this becomes English.

French, the language of instruction before Paul Kagame's accession to power, was officially replaced in schools by English. However, French classes were reintroduced weekly in primary schools, since 2016.

Statistics since 2003:

Despite some major achievements in Rwanda's attempts to achieve universal primary education, it currently has one of the worst repetition rates in the sub-saharan region.

At the end of primary schooling, students take the Primary Leaving Certificate (PLE).

Secondary schools

The teaching language is English.

Statistics, since 2007:

Secondary schooling is divided in Lower Secondary and Upper Secondary, both lasting 3 years. Lower Secondary, like primary, focuses on acquiring basic knowledge and skills. Together with primary, it constitutes 9YBE – 9 Year Basic Education. At the end of these 3 years, students take O-Level national examinations which allows them to progress Upper Secondary public schools. Many also continue into the TVET system - Technical and Vocation Education and Training.

Starting from Upper Secondary, students enter specific tracks:
 General Secondary Schooling (GSS): academic-style education, often as preparation for higher education, where students specialize in either Sciences, Humanities, or Languages and take A-Level national examinations.
 Technical Secondary Schooling (TSS): technical training leading to A2 level certification. Under EDPRS II development of technical and vocational skills training was identified as crucial to stimulate Rwandan economic growth. Under the auspice of the in 2008 created Workforce Development Authority (WDA) this technical secondary track is in the process of being integrated into the  Integrated Polytechnic Regional Centres (IPRC's), together with Vocational Training Centres (VTC's) and higher education Colleges of Technology (CoT's).
 Teacher Training Colleges (TTC): Students in this track are trained to become primary school teachers (though some also continue studies in higher education). For 16 TTC's, curriculum development, assessment and certification is the responsibility of the University of Rwanda's College of Education (UR-CE).

Number of students and gender balance in 2015:

Higher education

By 2015, there are 44 tertiary education institutions in Rwanda, 12 of them are public and 32 private. The first university in Rwanda, the National University of Rwanda (NUR now part of University of Rwanda), was opened by the government in 1963, with 49 students. By the 1999–2000 academic year, this had risen to 4,550. In 1997-8 Rwanda had a total of 5,571 students enrolled in higher education. Today this stands at 26,796, 39% of them female.

Throughout the higher education system some 100 PhDs are held, the bulk of them at NUR. Areas of research include agriculture, livestock, and the training of farm managers. A system of 'universités du soir' (night school universities) has been established to widen access to university. However, there has been some debate over the quality of the courses offered.

Rwanda's higher education sector has some way to go in developing the internal efficiency. In 2000–1, final year students were graduating with a success rate of between 11 and 50%. Across all years, this success rate is 53 to 76%.

The main higher learning institutions in Rwanda are:

 University of Rwanda, which in turn comprises 6 colleges:
 University of Rwanda - College of Science and Technology (formerly known as Kigali Institute of Science and Technology)
 University of Rwanda - College of Education (formerly known as Kigali Institute of Education )
 University of Rwanda - College of Medicine and Health Sciences (formerly known as Kigali Health Institute)
 University of Rwanda - College of Business and Economics (formerly known as School of Finance and Banking)
 University of Rwanda - College of Agriculture, Animal Sciences and Veterinary Medicine (formerly known as ISAE Busogo)
 University of Rwanda - College of Arts and Social Sciences (formerly known as National University of Rwanda)
 Rwanda Teachers College (RTC)
 African Leadership University
 Tumba College of technology (TCT)
 Umutara Polytechnic (UP)
 Integrated polytechnic Regional Centre Kicukiro Campus (IPRC)
 Institute of Legal Practice and Development (ILPD)
 Private Higher Learning Institutions
 Catholic Institute of Kabgayi (ICK)
 Kigali Independent University (ULK)
 Institut d’Agriculture, de Technologie et d’Education de Kibungo (INATEK)
 Institut Laique adventiste de Kigali (INILAK)
 Adventist University of Central and East Africa (AUCA)
 Institute of Applied Sciences Ruhengeri (INES)
 Catholic University of Rwanda (CUR)
 KIM University (formerly Kigali Institute of Management):www.kimuniversity.ac.rw
 Byumba Polytechnic (IPB) - Kibogora Polytechnic (KP)
 Protestant Institute of Arts & Social Sciences (PIASS)
 University of Tourism, Technology and Business Studies (UTB)
 Mount Kenya University Kigali Campus ( MKU Kigali )
 Kigali Health Institute, higher institute of agriculture and animal husbandry (ISAE)
 Akilah Institute for Women

See also
 List of schools in Rwanda

References

External links
 International Network of Higher Education In Africa
NUR University
Ministry of Education, Rwanda
Rwanda Education Commons, Rwanda
Rwanda Gateway
News From Africa
 Akilah Institute for Women
 University of Rwanda